"The Ballad of Boot Hill" is a 1959 song written by Carl Perkins which was recorded by Johnny Cash on Columbia Records.

Background

The song was originally released in 1959 in the U.S. on a Columbia EP by Johnny Cash entitled Johnny Cash Sings 'The Rebel --- Johnny Yuma'''. The song was also released on his 1965 LP album Sings the Ballads of the True West. The song is about the 1881 Gunfight at the O.K. Corral when three gunmen were killed by Doc Holliday. "The Ballad of Boot Hill" appeared on the 1992 Columbia collection The Essential Johnny Cash 1955-1983, a career retrospective of Johnny Cash's most important releases. The song was also released on an EP in Canada in 1959, Australia in 1960 and 1963, and in Germany in 1967.

Johnny Cash performed the song live at the London Palladium on October 27, 1968 in concert with Carl Perkins.

Cover versions
"The Ballad of Boot Hill" was recorded in 1984 by country and western singer Johnny Western which appeared on his 1989 album Gunfight at the O.K. Corral on Bear Family Records. In 2008, Mark van den Berg recorded the song for his collection Mark van den Berg Sings the Hits of Johnny Cash on the Continental Record Services label. Billy McFarland recorded the song on his 2013 album Golden Guitar. Giuseppe Grasso, Jaromir Hauptman, Gabi Schaetz, Peter Medwed, Rainer Jantz, Thommy Kletsch, and Jeff Johnson have also performed the song.

Album appearances
"The Ballad of Boot Hill" appears on the following Johnny Cash albums:Sings the Ballads of the True West (1965), Columbia RecordsMean as Hell! (1966), ColumbiaHeart of Cash (1968), ColumbiaWalls of a Prison (1970), HarmonyCome Along and Ride This Train (1991), Bear Family RecordsThe Essential Johnny Cash 1955–1983 (1992), Sony, 1992Sings the Ballads of the True West/Life, Sony BMG/Sony Music Distribution, 2006The Music of Johnny Cash, Columbia/Legacy/Sony Music Distribution, 2009		The Complete Columbia Album Collection Columbia/Legacy/Sony Music Distribution, 2012
Johnny Cash: The Box Set Series, Columbia/Legacy, 2014

References 

Songs written by Carl Perkins
Johnny Cash songs
1959 songs